The following outline is provided as an overview of and topical guide to Maharashtra:

Maharashtra – state in the western region of India and is India's third-largest state by area and is also the world's second-most populous sub-national entity. It has over 120 million inhabitants and its capital, Mumbai, has a population of approximately 18 million. Nagpur is Maharashtra's second capital as decreed by the Nagpur Pact.

General reference

Names 
 Common name: Maharashtra
 Originally known as :
 Pronunciation)
 Official name: Maharashtra
 Nicknames

 Adjectivals
 Maharashtrian
 Demonyms
 Maharashtrians
 Abbreviations and name codes
 ISO 3166-2 code:  IN-MH
 Vehicle registration code: MH

Rankings (amongst India's states) 

 by population: 2nd
 by area (2011 census): 3rd 
 by crime rate (2015): 8th
 by gross domestic product (GDP) (2014): 1st
by Human Development Index (HDI): 
by life expectancy at birth: 
by literacy rate:

General reference 
 Common English name: Maharashtra
 Pronunciation: 
 Official English name(s): Maharashtra
 Nickname(s): 
 Adjectival(s): 
 Demonym(s):

Geography of Maharashtra 

Geography of Maharashtra
 Maharashtra is: an Indian state
 Population of Maharashtra: 
 Area of Maharashtra:  
 Atlas of Maharashtra

Location of Maharashtra 
 Maharashtra is situated within the following regions:
 Northern Hemisphere
 Eastern Hemisphere
 Eurasia
 Asia
 South Asia
 India
West India
 Time zone:  Indian Standard Time (UTC+05:30)

Environment of Maharashtra

Protected areas in Maharashtra 

 Navegaon National Park
 Nagzira wildlife sanctuary
 Tadoba Andhari Tiger Project 
 Pench National Park
 Chandoli National Park
 Gugamal National Park
 Sanjay Gandhi National Park
 Sagareshwar Wildlife Sanctuary
 Maldhok Sanctuary
 Tansa wildlife Sanctuary
Bhimashankar wildlife Sanctuary.
 Phansad Wildlife Sanctuary
 Koyna Wildlife Sanctuary
 Matheran

Natural geographic features of Maharashtra 

 Rivers of Maharashtra

Regions of Maharashtra 

Regions of Maharashtra

Ecoregions of Maharashtra 

Ecoregions in Maharashtra

Administrative divisions of Maharashtra 

Administrative divisions of Maharashtra
 Districts of Maharashtra
 Municipalities of Maharashtra

Districts of Maharashtra 

 Districts of Maharashtra

Municipalities of Maharashtra 

Municipalities of Maharashtra

 Capital of Maharashtra: Capital of Maharashtra
 Cities of Maharashtra

Demography of Maharashtra 

Demographics of Maharashtra

Government and politics of Maharashtra 

Politics of Maharashtra

 Form of government: Indian state government (parliamentary system of representative democracy)
 Capital of Maharashtra: Capital of Maharashtra
 Elections in Maharashtra
 (specific elections)

Union government in Maharashtra 
 Rajya Sabha members from Maharashtra
 Maharashtra Pradesh Congress Committee
 Indian general election, 2009 (Maharashtra)
 Indian general election, 2014 (Maharashtra)

Branches of the government of Maharashtra 

Government of Maharashtra

Executive branch of the government of Maharashtra 

 Head of state: Governor of Maharashtra, 
 Head of government: Chief Minister of Maharashtra, 
 Council of Ministers of Maharashtra

Legislative branch of the government of Maharashtra 

Maharashtra Legislative Assembly
 Constituencies of Maharashtra Legislative Assembly

Judicial branch of the government of Maharashtra 

 High Court of Maharashtra
 Chief Justice of Maharashtra

Law and order in Maharashtra 

 Law enforcement in Maharashtra
 Maharashtra Police

History of Maharashtra 

History of Maharashtra

History of Maharashtra, by period 

 Mauryan
 Ashoka
 Hiuen-Tsang
 Dakshinapatha
 Satakarni
 Kharavela
 Western Satraps
 Gupta Empire
 Gurjara-Pratihara
 Vakataka
 Kadambas
 Chalukya Empire
 Rashtrakuta Dynasty
 Western Chalukya
 Yadava dynasty
 Delhi Sultanate
 Ala-ud-din Khalji
 Muhammad bin Tughluq
 Daulatabad
 Bahmani Sultanate
 Nizamshah
 Ahmadnagar Sultanate
 Adilshah
 Qutubshah
 Bidarshah
 Imadshah
 Vijayanagara Empire
 Sultanate of Gujarat
 Faruqi dynasty
 Adil Shahi dynasty
 Third Anglo-Maratha war
 Bombay Presidency
 Nagpur Province
 Central Provinces
 Berar
 Operation Polo

Prehistoric Maharashtra

Ancient Maharashtra

Medieval Maharashtra

Colonial Maharashtra

Contemporary Maharashtra 

 Chronology of statehood of Maharashtra

History of Maharashtra, by region

History of Maharashtra, by subject

Culture of Maharashtra 

Culture of Maharashtra
 Architecture of Maharashtra
 Cuisine of Maharashtra
 Monuments in Maharashtra
 Monuments of National Importance in Maharashtra
 State Protected Monuments in Maharashtra
 World Heritage Sites in Maharashtra

Art in Maharashtra 

 Music of Maharashtra

Cinema of Maharashtra 

Cinema of Maharashtra
 Bollywood
 Marathi cinema

Languages of Maharashtra 

 Languages of Maharashtra
 Marathi
 Ahirani
 Konkan
 Malvani
 Varhadi

People of Maharashtra 

 People from Maharashtra

Religion in Maharashtra 

Religion in Maharashtra
 Christianity in Maharashtra
 Hinduism in Maharashtra

Sports in Maharashtra 

Sports in Maharashtra
 Cricket in Maharashtra
 Maharashtra Cricket Association
 Maharashtra cricket team
 Football in Maharashtra
 Maharashtra football team

Symbols of Maharashtra 

Symbols of Maharashtra
 Animal: Indian giant squirrel
 Bird: Yellow-footed green pigeon
 Butterfly: Papilio polymnestor (Blue Mormon)
 Dance: Lavani
 Fish:
 Flower: Lagerstroemia
 Song: "Jai Jai Maharashtra Maza"
 Sport: Kabaddi
 Tree: Mango

Economy and infrastructure of Maharashtra 

Economy of Maharashtra
 Tourism in Maharashtra
 Transport in Maharashtra
 Airports in Maharashtra

Education in Maharashtra 

Education in Maharashtra
 Institutions of higher education in Maharashtra

Health in Maharashtra 

Health in Maharashtra

See also 

 Outline of India
 Tourism in Maharashtra
 Maratha Empire
 List of Maratha dynasties and states
 Maratha
 Marathi people
 Marathi language

References

External links 

 
 Maharashtra Government Website
 Department of Tourism, Government of Maharashtra

Maharashtra
Maharashtra